Electoral district of Tullamarine was an electoral district of the Legislative Assembly in the Australian state of Victoria. The district centred on the suburb of Tullamarine, about 17 km north-west of Melbourne.

Members for Tullamarine

Election results

References

Former electoral districts of Victoria (Australia)
1992 establishments in Australia
2002 disestablishments in Australia